Starzyny may refer to the following places:
Starzyny, Greater Poland Voivodeship (west-central Poland)
Starzyny, Łódź Voivodeship (central Poland)
Starzyny, Silesian Voivodeship (south Poland)